Growing Up Creepie is an animated television series created by Anthony Gaud, Chris Woods, and Carin Greenberg, and produced by Mike Young Productions. In other countries, the series was simply titled Creepie. The series premiered on September 9, 2006, and concluded on June 21, 2008, airing one season of 26 episodes.

Premise 
As told in the opening introduction and in the episode "Creepie Crawling", Creepie was an infant left on the doorstep of the Dweezwold Mansion, which is home to a family of various anthropomorphic insects. The family took her in and raised her as one of their own. She must now adjust to a life surrounded by a society of entomophobic humans as she attends Middlington Middle School and keeps her home life secret in order to protect both herself and her family.

Characters 
 Creepella "Creepie" Creecher (voiced by Athena Karkanis): The Gothic protagonist, a preteen girl raised by bugs. She was born with multicolored hair. She initially comes off as being sassy, but in reality, she is friendly and warm-hearted. Her catchphrase is "Wicked". She was abandoned on Caroleena and Vinnie's doorstep as a baby. Creepie's biological parents are never seen or mentioned, and no explanation is given for their absence. Her real name is Creepella, but everyone except Dr. Pappas and Vinnie calls her Creepie. If anyone ever finds out that Creepie is being raised by bugs she will have no choice but to live somewhere else, and the Dweezwold Mansion will be fumigated by Mr. Hollyruller. Her favorite color is black, and she is fiercely protective of her family and other insects.
 Caroleena (voiced by Julie Lemieux): A praying mantis who is Creepie's adoptive mother and Marge's best friend. She is very strict and constantly threatens to eat her children if they don't listen to her. It was her maternal instinct that persuaded her husband to adopt Creepie. She loves cooking.
 Vinnie (voiced by Dwayne Hill): A mosquito who is Creepie's adoptive father. He is a New Age vegan that has a sinister vampiric appearance. Like his wife, he is loving to his adopted daughter. He loves to paint and meditate.
 Gnat (voiced by Stevie Vallance): Creepie's younger brother, a gnat. He constantly sneaks in Creepie's backpack and causes havoc at school. Gnat is actually older than Creepie since he and Pauly were the ones that persuaded their family to adopt her.
 Pauly (voiced by David Berni): Creepie's older brother, a pillbug. He loves to eat and is a wise-cracking jokester.
 Budge Bentley (voiced by Richard Yearwood): Creepie's best friend. He is the only one who knows Creepie's secret. While Budge might look like a bully because of his height and size, in reality, he's a sweet guy who wouldn't hurt a fly. He is friends with Creepie and Chris-Alice. Budge is very smart like his dad and loves yoga. He also loves entomology.
 Chris-Alice Hollyruller (voiced by Leah Cudmore): Creepie's relentlessly happy friend and neighbor. Her catchphrases are, "Soggy Muffins" and "Super Mega Duper". Chris-Alice is on the cheerleading squad, takes karate, and is always signing Creepie up for stuff at school without asking her first. Her favorite color is pink. Her name is a pun on the word chrysalis, a form of immature insect. She has fair skin and auburn hair in a ponytail. Her outfit is a yellow T-shirt with a red/brown checkered skirt and yellow shoes.
 George Hollyruller (voiced by Scott McCord): Chris-Alice's father, the local exterminator. He is also the football coach at Middlington Middle School.
 Bunny Hollyruller (voiced by Stevie Vallance): Chris-Alice's mother, a hard-selling real estate agent. Like Chris-Alice, she is bossy and perky.
 Carla Cabrera and Melanie Melisma (voiced by Stephanie Anne Mills and Athena Karkanis, respectively): Two popular girls who maintain an on/off again friendship with Creepie. They are obsessed with Harry Helby, shopping, fashion, makeup, and their cell phones. Carla is the leader of the duo constantly seen with her cheerleading outfit and has her hair in unbraided pigtails. Melanie is a stereotypical dumb blonde and has problems with pronunciation. Her outfit consists of an orange T-shirt with a yellow cat on the front, green cargo pants, and white/orange sneakers. Also, she really enjoys shiny things and watches horror movies, almost as much as Budge. Melanie's favorite color is blue, and Carla's favorite color is purple. Carla and Melanie just want Creepie to be normal.
 Harry Helby (voiced by Scott McCord): The resident heartthrob who is obsessed with his hair. Melanie and Carla have a massive crush on him though he usually ignores them and is somewhat more interested in Creepie.
 Ms. Monserrate (voiced by Julie Lemieux): a firm but fair disciplinarian and principal of Middlington Middle School. Like Dr. Pappas, she's always spying on Creepie and the other students at Middlington Middle School and is a stickler for rules. She's obsessed with cleanliness. Her catchphrase is "Detention!". She will usually hand out a detention slip.
 Dr. Pappas (voiced by Juan Chioran): Creepie's homeroom and science teacher who is a stickler for rules. Dr. Pappas is always spying on Creepie and the other students at Middlington Middle School. He never cuts anybody a break if they're late turning in a class assignment or homework. His catchphrase is "Miss Creecher!" He refers to the students by their last names. He is probably insecure due to being practically bald and having a big nose. He is afraid of Budge.
 Tarantula Boy (real name: Skipper) (voiced by Dan Petronijevic): Creepie's love interest – seemingly half-human, half Goliath tarantula – a headliner at the carnival "freaky" show. In the episode "Creepie Meets Tarantula Boy", Creepie later found out he was a normal kid and Tarantula Boy was just a costume and lost interest in him. However, in the episode "Return of Tarantula Boy", he appears in a movie and meets back up with Creepie. He introduces her to his mother, who is a real tarantula. In turn, she introduced him to her family, and it turns out that Creepie's mother knew his mom when they were kids, later on, it is hinted that they would start a romantic relationship from then on, but it never developed.
 Marge (voiced by Leah Cudmore): A giant tarantula who is Skipper's adoptive mother and Caroleena's best friend. In the episode "Creepie Meets Tarantula Boy", she was revealed to be a giant tarantula who wears hair curlers. She made caramel apples for the carnival and that's how Skipper came to be in the freak show.
 Dr. Lance Pierce (voiced by Patrick McKenna): A prominent pin-happy entomologist at the Middlington Museum of Natural History and a minor antagonist in the show who only appears in three episodes. His catchphrase is "Oh no!".

Episodes

Music 
The theme song "Creepie Kids" and other songs featured throughout the series were performed by Samantha Lombardi. They were written by Michael Puskas, Samantha Lombardi, and Clarence Jey, and produced by Michael Puskas and Clarence Jey. "Creepie Kids" and the song "Life Lessons", heard in the episode "Goth To Have Better Friends", were released on Lombardi's 2007 album, Full Stop. The music was featured on a DVD released by Mike Young Productions.

The instrumental score heard throughout the show was composed by Guy Michelmore, who was nominated for an Annie for his music for the series.

Broadcast 
Growing Up Creepie aired on Discovery Kids in the United States and premiered on September 9, 2006. The final episode aired on June 21, 2008. After the series ended, reruns aired on The Hub until May 29, 2011.

It also aired on YTV in Canada and Nickelodeon worldwide. The show aired on ABC Kids in Australia from 2007 to 2010.

The series is available to stream on Sling TV and Spectrum TV Stream.

Reception 
Pam Gelman of Common Sense Media gave the series 3 out of 5 stars; saying that, "Growing Up Creepie has lots of dark, Tim Burton-esque visuals and scary organ tunes, but older grade-schoolers and tweens will recognize that both are used for dramatic effect and will be able to focus on Creepie's day-to-day challenges."

Awards and nominations 

|-
! scope="row" rowspan="2" style="text-align:center;" | 2007
| Annie Awards
| Directing in an Animated Television Production
| Guy Vasilovich (for "The Tell-Tale Poem")
| 
| 
|-
| Daytime Emmy Awards
| Outstanding Special Class Animated Program
| Growing Up Creepie
| 
| 
|-
! scope="row" rowspan="2" style="text-align:center;" | 2008
| Annie Awards
| Animation Production Artist
| Natasha Liberman (for "Creepie and the Candy Factory")
| 
| 
|-
| Daytime Emmy Awards
| Outstanding Individual Achievement in Animation
| Peter Ferk
| 
| 
|-
! scope="row" style="text-align:center;" | 2009
| Annie Awards
| Music in an Animated Television Production or Short Form
| Guy Michelmore (for "Rockabye Freakie")
| 
| 
|}

Home media 
A DVD of Growing Up Creepie was released for Region 1 from Genius Products on August 28, 2007. The single disc volume is titled Creepie's Creatures Volume 1 and features seven episodes. Bonus features include Creepie's Buggin' Trivia Game and an episode of Jeff Corwin Unleashed entitled "Creepy Creatures". It also had a DVD release in Australia from Madman Entertainment. There were plans for other volumes in Australia but they were never released. The episode "Creep of the Deep" appears as a bonus feature on Kenny the Shark Volume 3: Catch a Wave.

Notes

References

External links 
 Official Taffy Live website (archived)
 

2000s American animated television series
2000s Canadian animated television series
2006 American television series debuts
2006 Canadian television series debuts
2008 American television series endings
2008 Canadian television series endings
American children's animated comic science fiction television series
American children's animated education television series
American children's animated horror television series
American children's animated science fantasy television series
American children's animated comedy television series
American flash animated television series
Animated television series about insects
Animated television series about orphans
Canadian children's animated comic science fiction television series
Canadian children's animated education television series
Canadian children's animated horror television series
Canadian children's animated science fantasy television series
Canadian children's animated comedy television series
Canadian flash animated television series
Discovery Kids original programming
English-language television shows
Nature educational television series
Television series by Splash Entertainment
Television shows set in the United States
YTV (Canadian TV channel) original programming